IAAF World Challenge Beijing is an annual track and field competition held in Beijing, China, in May. First held in 2013, it takes place at the Beijing National Stadium, the venue for the Athletics at the 2008 Summer Olympics. It is part of the IAAF World Challenge circuit, the second tier of international track and field competitions after the IAAF Diamond League.

Meet records

Men

Women

References

External links
 Official website

Annual track and field meetings
IAAF World Challenge
Athletics competitions in China
Athletics in Beijing
Recurring sporting events established in 2013